This is a list of people who have served as Lord Lieutenant for the East Riding of Yorkshire. The office was established after the English Restoration in 1660, when a Lord Lieutenant was appointed for each Riding of Yorkshire. Since 1721, all Lord Lieutenants have also been Custos Rotulorum of the East Riding of Yorkshire, and for part of the period also Lieutenants of the Town and County of the Town of Kingston upon Hull. It was abolished on 31 March 1974 with the creation of the county of Humberside, but was re-created upon the abolition of Humberside on 1 April 1996.

Lord Lieutenants of the East Riding of Yorkshire to 1974
John Belasyse, 1st Baron Belasyse 26 July 1660 – 12 April 1673
James Scott, 1st Duke of Monmouth 12 April 1673 – 20 December 1679
John Sheffield, 3rd Earl of Mulgrave 20 December 1679 – 17 November 1682
Charles Seymour, 6th Duke of Somerset 17 November 1682 – 13 October 1687
John Sheffield, 3rd Earl of Mulgrave 13 October 1687 – 5 October 1688
Henry Cavendish, 2nd Duke of Newcastle-upon-Tyne 5 October 1688 – 26 March 1689
William Pierrepont, 4th Earl of Kingston-upon-Hull 26 March 1689 – 17 September 1690
Thomas Osborne, 1st Duke of Leeds 21 March 1691 – 11 August 1699
John Holles, 1st Duke of Newcastle-upon-Tyne 11 August 1699 – 15 July 1711
vacant
Peregrine Osborne, 2nd Duke of Leeds 29 March 1713 – 16 December 1714
Rich Ingram, 5th Viscount of Irvine 16 December 1714 – 10 April 1721
William Pulteney, 1st Earl of Bath 7 December 1721 – 15 July 1728
Arthur Ingram, 6th Viscount of Irvine 15 July 1728 – 30 May 1736
Sir Conyers Darcy July 1736 – 22 February 1738
Henry Ingram, 7th Viscount of Irvine 22 February 1738 – 4 April 1761
vacant
Francis Osborne, Marquess of Carmarthen 1 August 1778 – 22 March 1780
Frederick Howard, 5th Earl of Carlisle 22 March 1780 – 8 April 1782
Francis Osborne, 5th Duke of Leeds 8 April 1782 – 31 January 1799
Frederick Howard, 5th Earl of Carlisle 1 March 1799 – 29 September 1807
Henry Phipps, 1st Earl of Mulgrave 29 September 1807 – 10 September 1824
George Howard, 6th Earl of Carlisle 10 September 1824 – 31 January 1840
Paul Thompson, 1st Baron Wenlock 31 January 1840 – 18 June 1847
George Howard, 7th Earl of Carlisle 18 June 1847 – 5 December 1864
Beilby Lawley, 2nd Baron Wenlock 6 December 1864 – 6 November 1880
Marmaduke Constable-Maxwell, 11th Lord Herries of Terregles 21 December 1880 – 6 October 1908‡
Charles Wilson, 2nd Baron Nunburnholme 14 November 1908 – 15 August 1924‡
Robert Wilfrid de Yarburgh-Bateson, 3rd Baron Deramore 30 December 1924 – 1 April 1936‡
Michael Willoughby, 11th Baron Middleton 8 June 1936 – 17 April 1968‡
Charles Wood, 2nd Earl of Halifax 17 April 1968 –  31 March 1974 †

The position was abolished on 31 March 1974 by the Local Government Act 1972 and re-established in 1996.

‡His Majesty's Lieutenant of and in the East Riding of the County of York and the Town and County of the Town of Kingston-upon-Hull

† Became Lord Lieutenant of Humberside on 1 April 1974.

Lord Lieutenants of the East Riding of Yorkshire from 1996
Richard Marriott, CVO, TD, FSA, 1 April 1996 – 19 December 2005
Hon. Dame Susan Cunliffe-Lister, DCVO, 19 December 2005 – 2 November 2019
 James Dick, OBE, 2 November 2019 – present

Deputy Lieutenants
A deputy lieutenant of the East Riding of Yorkshire is commissioned by the Lord Lieutenant of the East Riding of Yorkshire. Deputy lieutenants support the work of the lord-lieutenant. There can be several deputy lieutenants at any time, depending on the population of the county. Their appointment does not terminate with the changing of the lord-lieutenant, but they usually retire at age 75.

19th Century
19 February 1831: The Hon. Charles Langdale
19 February 1831: Sir Thomas Aston Clifford-Constable, 
19 February 1831: The Rev. William Blow
19 February 1831: Thomas Clark, Esq.
19 February 1831: Robert Denison, Esq.
19 February 1831: William Constable Maxwell, Esq.
19 February 1831: The Rev. William Parker
19 February 1831: William Scholfield, Esq.
24 February 1831: William Hall, Esq.
24 February 1831: Joseph Robinson Pease, Esq.
24 February 1831: The Rev. Christopher Sykes
24 February 1831: Avison Terry, Esq.
24 February 1831: Joseph Sykes, Esq.
24 February 1831: Robert Thoroton, Esq.
24 February 1831: Charles Whitaker, Esq.
9 March 1831: The Rev. Danson Richardson Currer
9 March 1831: The Rev. Daniel Ferguson
9 March 1831: Mark Foulis, Esq.
9 March 1831: The Rev. Henry Ramsden
9 March 1831: Sir George Strickland, 
9 March 1831: Edward Taylor, Esq.
9 March 1831: Henry Willoughby, Esq.
9 March 1831: Joseph Smyth Windham, Esq.
10 March 1831: Sir Edmund Beckett,

References

 
History of the East Riding of Yorkshire
Local government in the East Riding of Yorkshire
1660 establishments in England